The 2013 Senior Bowl was an all-star college football exhibition game featuring players from the 2012 college football season, and prospects for the 2013 Draft of the professional National Football League (NFL). The 64th edition of the Senior Bowl was won by the South team, 21–16.

The game was played on January 26, 2013, (4 p.m. ET), at Ladd–Peebles Stadium in Mobile, Alabama. The coaching staff of the Detroit Lions, led by head coach Jim Schwartz, coached the South team. The coaching staff of the Oakland Raiders, led by head coach Dennis Allen, coached the North team. Schwartz had previously coached in the 2010 Senior Bowl.

Coverage of the event was provided on the NFL Network. Clothing company Nike was the sponsor for the second consecutive year, and provided apparel for the game. The referee for the game, David Smith of the Southeastern Conference (SEC), had been a quarterback for Alabama and MVP of the 1988 Sun Bowl.

Rosters

North Team

South Team

 Andre Ellington was injured in practice and did not play; his roster spot was filled by Mike James.

Game summary
Source:

Scoring summary
1st quarter
 South – EJ Manuel 2-yard run (Dustin Hopkins kick)
 South – Michael Williams 20-yard pass from Manuel (Dustin Hopkins kick)
2nd quarter
 none
3rd quarter
 North – Johnathan Franklin 20-yard run (Quinn Sharp kick)
 North – Quinn Sharp 42-yard field goal
4th quarter
 South – Mike James 4-yard run (Dustin Hopkins kick)
 North – Kenjon Barner 2-yard pass from Zac Dysert (Two-point pass conversion failed)

Statistics

References

Senior Bowl
Senior Bowl
Senior Bowl
Senior Bowl